The Focke-Wulf Volksjäger, meaning "People's Fighter" in German, was a German emergency fighter project for the Luftwaffe. It was designed by Focke-Wulf industries towards the end of World War II as part of the defense effort against the devastating Allied bombing raids.

History

In mid 1944 the Nazi Ministry of Aviation launched a Volksjäger program and in the months that followed Focke-Wulf presented two consecutive projects. The variants presented were a turbojet and a rocket-powered design, corresponding to project number one and project number two. Neither of them was given an RLM aircraft designation.

Variants

Volksjäger 1
The initial Volksjäger competition in the second half of 1944 required the use of the BMW 003 powerplant. The Focke-Wulf Volksjäger 1, the first model of the Focke-Wulf project, was an innovative-looking single-jet aircraft. It was designed to be powered by one BMW 003 A1 turbojet as an actual contract competitor to the He 162A Spatz, the winner of the Volksjäger design competition and the selected Volksjäger aircraft to be mass-produced.

The air intake of the turbojet engine was placed in the front and the engine itself in the lower fuselage. Two possible shoulder wing configurations were designed for the Fw Volksjäger 1, straight and swept back. The wings of the swept back version spanned 7.5 m (26 ft 7 in) and had an area of 13.5 m² (161 ft²). The tail was supported by a projecting boom over the exhaust of the engine. This fighter aircraft was planned to be armed with two MK 108 cannon, placed in a frontal position on both sides of the air intakes.

In some postwar English language publications, the Fw Volksjäger 1 project is referred to by the bogus name "Volksflugzeug", a name that is not found in any German-language source referring to this aircraft, but referring instead to a very different Nazi aviation project.

Volksjäger 2
Designed for early 1945 RLM requirements the Focke-Wulf Volksjäger 2 was a small rocket-powered interceptor. Power was to be provided by a Walter HWK 109-509 A-2 rocket engine that would enable it to reach speeds nearing 1000 km/h. Armament was to be two 30 mm (1.18 in) MK 108 cannon located under the fuselage.

In order to save strategic materials, the wings of the Fw Volksjäger 2 were built of wood and covered with a thin metal layer. The wings, swept back and mounted on mid-fuselage, as well as the T-tail, were similar to those of the Focke-Wulf Ta 183. The aircraft had no wheels, only a landing skid. It was designed to take off on a detachable dolly. Once airborne it would speed almost vertically towards the bomber combat box where it would fire its cannon.

Although the Fw Volksjäger 2 was planned to reach an altitude of 5,900 m in one minute, its effectiveness as an interceptor was curtailed by the fact that it would have only about 15 minutes of combat action time. Test flights for this aircraft were scheduled to be carried out between May and June 1945. Three units of the Fw Volksjäger 2 were under construction at the time of the Surrender of Nazi Germany.

Specifications

Volksjäger 1

Volksjäger 2

See also

Bibliography
Walter Schick , Geheimprojekte der Luftwaffe- Jagdflugzeuge 1939–1945, Motorbuch Verlag; 1st edition (1994)

References

External links

Super Lorin
Abandoned military aircraft projects of Germany
Rocket-powered aircraft
World War II fighter aircraft of Germany
Mid-wing aircraft
T-tail aircraft